Magic is the fifth studio album by Taiwanese singer Jolin Tsai. It was released on March 7, 2003, by Sony. Produced by Bing Wang, Peter Lee, Jamie Hsueh, Jay Chou, and Huang Yi, it incorporated genres of pop, disco, funk, hip-hop, and Britpop. It was well received by music critics, who commented that it was the key piece of her first musical reinvention and established her dance-oriented musical direction.

The album sold more than 1.5 million copies in Asia. In Taiwan, it topped the album sales chart for 10 consecutive weeks and sold more than 360,000 copies, becoming the year's highest-selling album by a female artist and the year's second highest-selling album overall. The album earned three Golden Melody Award nominations, it was nominated for Album of the Year, Tsai was nominated for Best Female Mandarin Singer, and Baby Chung was nominated for Best Music Arrangement for the track, "Prague Square". Eventually, Baby Chung won Best Music Arrangement.

Background and development 
On January 22, 2002, it was revealed that Tsai would start working on her new album and she would sign to Sony. On April 5, 2002, it was revealed that her new album would be released in September 2002 and she would sign to Ke Fu-hung's management company Era. On April 23, 2002, Tsai signed a recording contract with Sony. On the same date, she released the single, "The Spirit of Knight". On September 16, 2002, Tsai said that she had collected five songs for her new album and would start recording for the album. On December 7, 2002, it was revealed that the album would be released in January 2003.

On February 12, 2003, Sony held an album preview session and invited a series of musicians including Jamie Hsueh, Paula Ma, and John Yuan. On the same date, it was revealed that her new album changed the traditional way of choosing from hundreds of demos, but chose to directly invite songwriters to create music tailored to her vocal characteristics. On February 13, 2003, it was revealed that the album would be released on March 7, 2003.

Writing and recording 

"Magic" was the promotional song of the video game, Asgard. The beginning sounds both mysterious and playful, and it used computer technology to simulate the sound of sanxian. It integrated elements including disco and hip-hop, and it is full of leaps and bounds. "Fake Confess" was described as "the most authentic vocal performance since her debut". Tsai's sad voice delicately portrayed the hard feelings describe in the lyrics. The violin in the beginning and then the string quartet and the classical piano in the middle drive the listeners' emotions up and down with the music. "Say Love You" features Tsai's sweet but not greasy voice, combined with the clever and humorous rap harmony, as if in a happy romantic comedy. The music arrangement which emphasizes on electric guitar shows a cool Britpop style. "Be You for a Day" is a ballad that Jamie Hsueh tailored for her, the gentle piano melody combined with Tsai's gloomy voice show the girls' sense of loss and longing for true love, she also used a different way of singing by adjusting the place of articulation to produce a softer vocal performance.

The lyrics of "Rope on Vest" were written by Tsai, and they were inspired during a signing session for her photo book, The Masque of the Princess, the Spirit of Knight. Even though her heart was full of emotions but still had to smile in front of fans, at that time the contractual dispute between Tsai and D Sound hasn't yet been resolved, when facing with unprecedented career difficulties and challenges from the future, she believed that the 'halo' of superstars was like the vest worn by girls, which imposed restraint and pressure. It also reflects her desperate desire for freedom during the contractual dispute period. Sony asked dozens of musicians to write the melody, and Tsai finally chose Clayton Cheung's work. The song is a three-beat waltz, after fused with piano, strings, and MIDI post-production, it is rich in chord changes. "Prove It" is a powerful, heavy hip-hop dance song. Tsai used her powerful voice to demonstrate a dynamic atmosphere, the lyrics also describe girls' attitude towards simple and happy relationship. "The Spirit of Knight" was the promotional song of tourism in Thailand. The lyrics were written by Tsai, and they describe girls' desire to be protected.

Title and artwork 
For the album's title, Tsai explained: "After one year's break, I hope you can see my changes in performance, different songs used some special singing voices, and the dance moves are more agile and varied, the outfits we chose are more diverse and colorful. In fact, great changes have taken place in many aspects. I hope you can see my obvious change from all aspects."

The standard edition's cover and artwork are based on the theme of "evolution of hibernation", and it shows Tsai's growth and changes in the past two years with the concept of three stages—"hibernation", "awakening", and "ice-breaking". The cover features the background of blue sky, white clouds, water droplets, and glaciers. Tsai stood in a pool of water in a white off-shoulder outfit and high riding boots, the fabric of the outfit was purchased by Taiwanese stylist Chen Sun-hua from Japan, and then it was tailored by Chinese designer Wang Qinghua, highlighting Tsai's transformation from a childish girl to a mature woman.

Release and promotion 
On March 6, 2003, Sony held an album premiere in Taipei, Taiwan, and the label revealed that the album cost a total of NT$40 million. On March 13, 2003, it topped the album sales charts of G-Music and Asia Records in Taiwan in the first week of release. On April 12, 2003, Tsai held the Say Love You Concert in Tainan, Taiwan. On May 18, 2003, Tsai held the Say Love You Concert in Taipei, Taiwan, which was broadcast on Azio TV and video streaming website MyMuch. On the same day, it was reported that it topped the G-Music's album sales chart for 10 consecutive weeks.

On May 23, 2003, Tsai released the album's deluxe celebration edition, which additionally includes 11 music videos. On June 16, 2003, G-Music and Asia Records jointly launched an album sales chart for the first half of the year 2003, and it was revealed that the album topped the chart and sold more than 290,000 copies in Taiwan. On August 10, 2003, Sony announced that its sales in China and the total sales in Asia exceeded 500,000 and 1 million copies, respectively. On August 29, 2003, Tsai held the Magic Concert in Las Vegas, United States.

Live performances 
On March 8, 2003, Tsai participated in the Taiwan TV's television show Variety Flagship and sang "Magic". On April 13, 2003, Tsai participated in the My Way Concert, where she sang "Fake Confess" and "Say Love You". On July 5, 2003, she participated in the J. S. G. Selections and sang "Say Love You". On August 2, 2003, Tsai participated in the 14th Golden Melody Awards and sang "Magic". On August 13, 2003, she participated in the recording of Hunan TV's television show Music and sang "Magic", "The Spirit of Knight", "Fake Confess", and "Say Love You". On October 10, 2003, Tsai participated in the Believe Taiwan Fighting Party and sang "The Spirit of Knight", "Magic", "Prague Square", and "Say Love You".

On November 2, 2003, Tsai participated in the Huangpu River Source Ecological Culture Festival and sang "Magic", "Prague Square", and "Say Love You". On November 15, 2003, Tsai participated in the Asia Super Star Anti Piracy Concert and sang "Magic" and "Say Love You". On November 30, 2003, Tsai participated in the Star Storm Concert and sang "Magic", "Said Love You", and "Fake Confess". On December 3, 2003, Tsai participated in the 2003 Metro Radio Hits Music Awards and sang "Say Love You". On December 24, 2003, she participated in the Christmas Party held by Eastern TV and sang "Say Love You" and "Fake Confess". Since then, Tsai has been performing songs from the album at various events.

Singles and music videos 

On February 19, 2003, Tsai released the single, "Magic". The music video of the song was directed by Kuang Sheng. It focuses on the details and realism of computer effect. It cost a total of NT$2 million to use computer technology to replace dancers with video game's characters dancing with Tsai. The choreography in the music video was choreographed by Rambo Lan, and the complicated gestures and moves seem to do magic tricks. Tsai also changed four outfits in the music video.

The music video of "The Spirit of Knight" was directed by Tony Lin, and it was filmed at the Ayutthaya Historical Park and Wat Yai Chai Mongkhon in Thailand. Tsai said that it is full of ancient Rome's feeling, showing a strong exoticism. The music video of "Fake Confess" was directed by Tony Lin, and it was filmed at the Yongpyong Resort in South Korea, where the Korean television series Winter Sonata was shot. The music video of "Prague Square" was directed by Kuang Sheng, and it is full of exotic fantasy style. Tsai incarnated a medieval musician in the music video, and the scenes, props, and costumes were also created in a medieval European style. The music video of "Say Love You" was directed by Kuang Sheng and features Taiwanese actor Nick Chao. Both music videos of "Be You for a Day" and "Rope on Vest" were directed by Tony Lin.

On January 12, 2004, "Magic" reached number 24 on the Hit FM Top 100 Singles of the Year chart of 2003, and "Say Love You" and "Prague Square" reached number three and number 65, respectively.

Critical reception 
Tencent Entertainment's Shuwa commented: "Magic brought Jolin Tsai more than just the transformation of her image. The popularity of musical works and the diversity of musical styles are also refreshing. Sony's repositioning of Jolin Tsai is one of the major factors that made this album successful. The rigor, seriousness, and meticulousness in the selection of lyrics and melodies are also a highlight of this album. The collaboration with producers Huang Yi, Jamie Hsueh, Bing Wang, and Jay Chou made the songs sound stylish and international, and it can be said the dance songs and ballads in the album are both fashionable and popular in a real sense," Shuwa added: "Farewell to the Universal period of dance songs are exciting but not popular and ballads are lyrical but boring, this album is more delicate in both dance songs and ballads. Disco, funk, and rock quickly became the trend indicators of Mandopop. The popularity of Jay Chou's R&B style contributed a lot to the album's success." Taiwanese musician Kay Huang commented: "There are a lot of really good songs on the album Magic, and the album also helped Jolin find a new position. The whole concept of the album is good, I can see it's a collective effort, and it also created the popularity of Mandopop," she added: "Jolin has become a phenomenon, a topic in the music scene, some may disagree, but today's young people love to listen to her sing songs like these, if looking back at the current Mandarin music scene after many years, Jolin's Magic is definitely a representative work."

Music critic Qing Yanling commented: "Jolin Tsai used the album to directly declare her transformation, the songs mostly tell the story of her life at that time, this is definitely the best model for all singers, especially dance music singers, of the same period and after, this way is also applicable today." Apple Music Taiwan stated: "Jolin Tsai's fifth album Magic is the key work of transformation. She broke the stereotype as a 'Teenage Boys Killer', no longer stuck to ballads, but invited many musicians to create a variety of songs for her, and established the music direction dominated by dance music." Apple Music China stated: "The album is well-made, ballads are smooth, dance songs are full of energy, laid the foundation for her versatile style." Taiwan's Marie Claire commented: "After a period of break, Magic opened Jolin Tsai a new chapter, new musical styles coupled with improved dancing ability, there is also a more confident image building, not only did the album sell well, it was also nominated for three Golden Melody Awards, including Album of the Year and Best Female Mandarin Singer." Sina Entertainment's Gao Weian commented: "In Magic, Jolin boldly expanded her musical style, in Jolin's own words, it was all about "hitting the high notes", but it's more of singing lightly on this album, walking around in low tunes is another way of expressing emotions." Sohu Entertainment commented: "Although this is still an album that the label used to promote Jolin Tsai, but after all, there are decent musicians like Jay Chou to involve in the album, it is a pity that too many musicians are involved in a record, which made it looks neither fish nor fowl, trying to get a little bit of everything, but ending up with nothing."

Accolades 
On July 5, 2003, "Say Love You" won Favorite Mandarin Song at the J. S. G. Selections (season 2). On July 28, 2003, the album won Best Album at the G-Music Chart, and Tsai won Best Female Singer. On August 3, 2003, Tsai won a Metro Radio Mandarin Hits Music Award for Best Female Singer, and "Say Love You" won Top Songs. On September 6, 2003, Tsai won a Singapore Hit Award for Favorite Singer (Taiwan). On November 6, 2003, Tsai was nominated an MTV Asia Award for Favorite Artist Taiwan. On December 28, 2003, Tsai won a Metro Radio Hits Music Awards for Best Female Singer (Mandarin) and "Say Love You" won Top Songs (Mandarin).

On January 19, 2004, "Prague Square" won Top 10 Songs (Mandarin) at the Canadian Chinese Pop Music Chart. On February 21, 2004, the album won a Hito Music Award for Most Weeks on Chart Album, Tsai won Best Female Singer, "Say Love You" won Most Weeks at Number One Song and Top Songs. On March 28, 2004, "Say Love You" won a Top Chinese Music Award for Top 10 Songs (Hong Kong/Taiwan). On March 30, 2004, the album was nominated a Golden Melody Award for Album of the Year, Tsai was nominated for Best Female Mandarin Singer, Baby Chung was nominated for Best Music Arrangement for "Prague Square". On April 10, 2004, the album won an IFPI Hong Kong Top Sales Music Award for Top 10 Selling Albums (Mandarin). On May 8, 2004, Baby Chung won a Golden Melody Award for Best Music Arrangement. On July 11, 2004, "Prague Square" won Top 10 Songs at the Southern Music Festival.

Track listing

Release history

References

External links 
 
 

2003 albums
Jolin Tsai albums
Sony Music Taiwan albums